The British East Mediterranean Relay Station (also known as BEMRS) was one of the most powerful broadcasting stations in Cyprus.

The short-wave transmitters were located at Zygi .

The station was used for broadcasting BBC programmes from 1957 until April 2015 when transmissions ended. Previously an Arabic station (Near East Broadcasting Station), it was taken over by the Diplomatic Wireless Service as a result of the Suez Crisis.

Antenna systems
The medium-wave station had two directional antenna systems each consisting of four free-standing lattice towers with triangular cross section. All used towers were insulated against ground.
The antenna system for 720 kHz, which was situated north of the transmitter building, pointed to an azimuth of 110 degrees. Its towers were 102 metres tall.
The antenna system for 639 kHz, which was situated south of the transmitter building, pointed in a southerly direction (azimuth 180 degrees). Its towers were 120 metres tall.

References

External links 
 http://wikimapia.org/#lat=34.618941&lon=33.003273&z=13&l=5&m=b&show=/5227753/BBC-World-Service-Limassol
 http://www.fco.gov.uk/en/travel-and-living-abroad/find-an-embassy/europe/east-mediterranean-relay-station
 https://www.bbc.co.uk/mediacentre/statements/mw-eastern-med

Towers in Cyprus
BBC
Defunct mass media in Cyprus